The 1979 FIFA World Youth Championship, the second staging of the FIFA World Youth Championship, was held in Japan from 26 August to 7 September 1979. It was the first FIFA tournament played in Asia. The tournament took place in four cities — Kobe, Omiya, Tokyo and Yokohama — where a total of 32 matches were played, four more than in the previous edition due to the addition of a quarterfinal round in the knockout stage.

Argentina won the trophy after beating holders Soviet Union 3–1, in a final held at Tokyo's National Stadium. Argentina fielded an attack-minded high-scoring team, averaging 3.33 goals per game. They were led by the powerful duo of Diego Maradona and Ramón Díaz, who were the tournament's best player and top scorer respectively. Between the two of them, they scored 14 of Argentina's 20 goals (70%).

Qualification 

1.Teams that made their debut.

Squads 
For a list of all squads that played in the final tournament, see 1979 FIFA World Youth Championship squads.

Venues

Group stage

Group A

Group B

Group C

Group D

Knockout stage

Quarter-finals

Semi-finals

Third place play-off

Final

Result

Awards

Goalscorers 
Ramón Díaz of Argentina won the Golden Shoe award for scoring eight goals. In total, 83 goals were scored by 48 different players, with none of them credited as own goal.

8 goals
  Ramón Díaz
6 goals
  Diego Maradona
5 goals
  Andrzej Pałasz
4 goals
  Julio César Romero
  Igor Ponomaryov
  Rubén Paz
3 goals
  Gabriel Calderón
2 goals

  Branko Segota
  Roberto Cabañas
  Krzysztof Baran
  Oleg Taran
  Ernesto Vargas
  Felipe Revelez
  Haris Smajić
  Nedeljko Milosavljević

1 goal

  Derradji Bendjaballah
  Hocine Yahi
  Hugo Alves
  Juan Simón
  Osvaldo Escudero
  Louis Nagy
  György Kerepeczky
  József Kardos
  Sándor Segesvári
  Takashi Mizunuma
  Lee Tae-Ho
  Armando Romero Manríquez
  Enrique Hernández Velázquez
  Mario Diaz
  Julio Achucarro
  Ramon Isasi
  Jan Janiec
  Kazimierz Buda
  Krzysztof Frankowski
  Joao Grilo
  Rui Ferreira
  Aleksandr Zavarov
  Anatoli Radenko
  Mikhail Olefirenko
  Sergei Stukashov
  Vladimir Mikhalevsky
  Yaroslav Dumansky
  Joaquín Pichardo
  Luis Miguel Gail
  Manuel Zúñiga
  Daniel Martínez
  Hector Molina
  Marko Mlinarić

Final ranking

External links 
 FIFA World Youth Championship Japan 1979 , FIFA.com
 RSSSF > FIFA World Youth Championship > 1979
 FIFA Technical Report
 All Matches of the Brazilian Soccer Team
 Todos os Jogos da Seleção Brasileira de Futebol

FIFA World Youth Championship
International association football competitions hosted by Japan
Fifa World Youth Championship, 1979
FIFA World Youth Championship
August 1979 sports events in Asia
September 1979 sports events in Asia